The Mar del Plata International Film Festival is an international film festival that takes place every November in the city of Mar del Plata, Argentina. It is the only competitive feature festival recognized by the FIAPF in Latin America, and the oldest in this category in the Americas. The festival is organized by the National Institute of Cinema and Audiovisual Arts (INCAA).

History 
 
Created in 1954 by Jesus Miller, it was not considered to be a competitive festival, it was just an exhibition of selected international movies; during this stage the event was named Festival Cinematográfico Internacional (International Cinematographic Festival).

In the early years famous international guests such as Mary Pickford, Gina Lollobrigida, Edward G. Robinson and Errol Flynn attended the event. The festival continued in this way until 1959, when the Argentine Film Critics Association took charge of running it; during this time the festival was approved and recognized by FIAPF.

In 1964 the festival moved temporarily to Buenos Aires, and the name was changed to Festival Cinematográfico Internacional de la República Argentina (International Cinematographic Festival of the Argentine Republic). In 1966 there was a military coup d'état in Argentina; in 1968 and 1970 the Instituto de Cine took charge of the festival.

From 1967 to 1969 the festival was cancelled because there were other festivals in Rio de Janeiro, Brazil. During the 1960s several well-known guests appeared, including: Paul Newman, Alberto Sordi, Pier Paolo Pasolini, Vittorio Gassman, Toshirō Mifune, François Truffaut, Karel Reisz, Catherine Deneuve, Juan Antonio Bardem, Anthony Perkins, Jean-Paul Belmondo, Maria Callas, Cantinflas, Andrzej Wajda, Jacques Tati, Lee Strasberg, George Hamilton.

After the 1970 edition, the festival was canceled when Argentina entered an unstable sociopolitical period that culminated in the highly repressive military dictatorship that ruled Argentina from 1976 to 1983. There were some attempts to reactivate it, but none succeeded until 1996, when the festival returned with new renovations. Since then there have been several changes. In the first years the event was not held in March; from 2001 to 2007 it returned to that month, and since 2008 it has been held in November. During this stage the festival was granted a 'Category A', the highest class assigned by FIAPF, making it the most important film festival of Latin America. 
Nowadays, after a history marked by unstable political situations in Argentina, the festival is in constant growth and slowly regaining its historical reputation.

Awards 
The main prize of the International Competition had different names throughout the history of the festival, but in 2004 it was definitely changed to Ástor in honor of the Argentine musician Ástor Piazzolla. The twenty-second Mar del Plata Film Festival, held in March 2007, introduced a new competition specifically for Latin American film-makers. Now days, the festival helds four main competitions organised in various sections of the official selection: International Competition, Latin American Competition, Argentine Competition and, the more experimental one, Altered States Competition.

Currently, the awards given by the jury at the International Competition are: Golden Ástor for Best Film, Silver Ástor for Best Director, Silver Ástor for Best Actress, Silver Ástor for Best Actor, Silver Ástor for Best Script, and a Special Jury Award.

Golden Ástor Winners 

 * Denotes first win

Complete list of winners

References

External links 
 Official website
 Mar del Plata Website with news, activities and information

1954 establishments in Argentina
Film festivals in Argentina
Argentine film awards
Tourist attractions in Mar del Plata
Film festivals established in 1954
Spring (season) events in Argentina